Edra Soto (born 1971) is a Chicago-based multidisciplinary artist, curator, educator and co-director of the artist-run outdoor project space The Franklin.

Biography
Edra Soto was born in Puerto Rico in 1971. She received a Bachelor of Fine Arts degree from Escuela de Artes Plasticas de Puerto Rico in 1994. After moving to Chicago, she earned a Master of Fine Arts degree from the School of the Art Institute of Chicago in 2000. She has received a number of awards, including the Efroymson Contemporary Arts Fellowship (2016) and the Department of Cultural Affairs and Special Events (DCASE) Individual Artists Award (2017). She has curated numerous exhibitions, including co-curating Present Standard at the Chicago Cultural Center in 2016. She is a faculty member in the Contemporary Practices Department at The School of the Art Institute of Chicago. Her work has been exhibited in solo and group shows both nationally and internationally.

The Franklin
In 2012, Soto and her husband Dan Sullivan founded The Franklin, an artist-run project space in the backyard of their home in Garfield Park, featuring installations and site-specific work by Chicago and national artists.

The Franklin Collection of over 200 artworks by local, national and international artists is also at the Garfield Park location.

Works
Soto's ongoing site-specific GRAFT series, begun in 2013, incorporates the geometric designs of iron rejas screens popular throughout Puerto Rico. In 2014, Soto and Dan Sullivan were awarded a public art commission from the Chicago Transit Authority (CTA) for the Blue Line Western Station. Their work will be a large-scale installation for the stationhouse exterior.

Selected recent exhibitions
2015 DOMINODOMINO, with Dan Sullivan, Morgan Lehman Gallery, New York, NY
2017 Manual GRAFT, University Galleries, Illinois State University, Normal IL
2017 OPEN 24 HOURS, Museum of Contemporary Art of Chicago
2017 Traduttore,Traditore, Gallery 400, Chicago
2019 Forgotten Forms, Chicago Cultural Center
2019 “Cross Currents: Intercambio Cultural”, Centro de Desarrollo de las Artes Visuales, Havana, Cuba and Smart Museum, Chicago (forthcoming)

References

External links

1971 births
Living people
21st-century Puerto Rican women
Puerto Rican women artists
Artists from Chicago
School of the Art Institute of Chicago alumni
20th-century Puerto Rican women
American women curators
American curators